The 1973–74 Southern Hockey League season was the first season of the Southern Hockey League. The league was formed when the Eastern Hockey League split in two; the southern teams became the Southern Hockey League, and the northern teams became the North American Hockey League. Four of the six founding members of the SHL came from the EHL, including the Charlotte Checkers, Greensboro Generals, Roanoke Valley Rebels, and the Suncoast Suns. Two expansion teams were added to complete the league, including the Macon Whoopees, and the Winston-Salem Polar Twins.

Six teams began the season, but two did not complete the schedule due to financial trouble. The Suncoast Suns folded on December 19, 1973. The Macon Whoopees forfeited a game against Charlotte on January 17, 1974 when players refused to play because of not being paid. The team eventually folded on February 15, 1974. The remaining four teams made the playoffs, with the Roanoke Valley Rebels finishing as James Crockett Cup champions.

Standings
Final standings of the regular season.

WHA/NHL affiliations
Southern Hockey League franchises were primarily affiliated with World Hockey Association teams, however some also had agreements with National Hockey League teams. Summary of WHA/NHL affiliation agreements:

Scoring leaders
Top 10 SHL points scoring leaders.

Playoffs
James Crockett Cup playoffs.

References

Southern
Southern Hockey League (1973–1977)